The Battle of Orewin Bridge (also known as the Battle of Irfon Bridge) was fought between English (led by the Marcher Lords) and Welsh armies on 11 December 1282 near Builth Wells in mid-Wales. It was a decisive defeat for the Welsh because their leader, Llywelyn ap Gruffudd was killed, and this effectively ended the autonomy of Wales.

Background of the War

Llywelyn had already fought a war against Edward I of England in 1277. Edward had organised a large full-time army with which he overran all North Wales as far west as the Conwy River, and a fleet with which he captured Anglesey, depriving the Welsh of much of their grain. Llywelyn was forced to come to humiliating terms, and ceded large areas of Wales to England.

Over the five years which followed, there was continued tension between Llywelyn and Edward over various lawsuits, and increasing unrest between the Welsh people and their English administrators in the newly transferred areas. The revolt was actually begun in 1282 by Llywelyn's brother Dafydd, who had sided with Edward five years earlier but now captured Hawarden Castle and slaughtered its garrison. This was followed by uprisings in many parts of Wales, and Llywelyn declared war on Edward on behalf of all Welsh.

Campaign up to December
Edward repeated his tactics of the previous war, laboriously occupying North Wales as far as the Vale of Conwy and occupying Anglesey, while sending armies into southern and central Wales to overawe or subdue Llewelyn's allies and potential supporters. At the Battle of Llandeilo Fawr the English army attacking south Wales was ambushed and destroyed by the southern Welsh. On 6 November, Edward's lieutenant in Anglesey, Luke de Tany, launched a premature attack across a bridge of boats which spanned the Menai Strait. His force was ambushed, cut off and slaughtered at the Battle of Moel-y-don.

These unexpected reverses undoubtedly set Edward back several months. He was forced to pause to raise fresh armies and supplies. Llywelyn took advantage of the respite by making an expedition into mid-Wales, to inspire and rally support. This was the territory nominally ruled by Marcher Lords, who enjoyed considerable independence from Edward. Some were wavering and prepared to support Llywelyn. However, three of them, Roger l'Estrange, John Giffard and Edmund Mortimer were staunch supporters of Edward, and were in the field in mid-Wales with an army consisting mainly of archers from Shropshire and some heavy cavalry, as well as troops donated to them by the Welsh lord Gruffydd ap Gwenwynwyn, who was an old enemy of Llywelyn. The English are thought to have had an army consisting of around 5000 infantrymen and 1300 heavy cavalry.

The battle
On 11 December, Llywelyn's army occupied a hillside north of the Irfon River near the village of Cilmeri, placed to repel any attack from the south across Orewin Bridge. The army is thought to have consisted of a few thousand spearmen and javelinmen from North Wales, with some men-at-arms from Llywelyn's own teulu (household), and some local archers from Brecon (who had betrayed their former English allies and joined Llywelyn, having been disappointed in the English failure at the Battle of Llandeilo Fawr). Altogether, the army is thought to have added up to around 7000 infantry and 160 Cavalry (Llywelyn's Teulu). Llywelyn himself was not present, having gone to speak with local leaders (possibly at Builth Castle).

A local inhabitant had told the Marchers about a ford across the Irfon two miles downstream, near its confluence with the River Wye, and they sent most of their archers across it to attack the Welsh in the flank. The Welsh army turned to face them, and the English mounted men-at-arms charged across the now undefended bridge.

Meanwhile, the English archers shot into the Welsh spear schiltrons, weakening and disorganising the troops. The English heavy cavalry then charged the rear of the army. The leaderless and demoralised Welsh were routed.

As the Welsh army fled, Llywelyn returned in haste. On the outskirts of the fighting, he was attacked and cut down by an English man-at-arms named Stephen de Frankton, an English centenar from Ellesmere, Shropshire.

Aftermath
Llywelyn's body was not recognised until the next day (he had probably gone in secret or incognito to his meeting, and would therefore not have worn any surcoat or other heraldic device). His head was cut off, and taken to London to be exhibited. He left only an infant daughter, Gwenllian of Wales. Leadership of the Welsh fell to Dafydd, who led a guerrilla resistance for some months but was soon betrayed, captured and executed as a traitor. Edward was able to formally end the existence of an organised resistance to English rule in the Welsh regions.

Sources
Famous Welsh Battles, Philip Warner, Fontana, 1977, 

Orewin Bridge
Orewin Bridge
1282 in Wales
13th century in Wales
Conflicts in 1282
England–Wales relations